Luis Görlich (born 1 April 2000) is a German professional footballer who plays as a full-back for Dutch club PEC Zwolle.

Career
Görlich came through the academy at 1899 Hoffenheim before playing for Eintracht Braunschweig. After one season at Braunschweig he looked to move on for more game time as they had plenty of options in the right flank positions. 

Görlich impressed on trial at PEC Zwolle in the summer of 2022. He signed a two-year contract with the option for a third on 3 August, 2022. Görlich scored his first goal in the Eerste Divisie away at SC Telstar in a 5–0 victory at their BUKO Stadion. He followed this up with a brace in a 4–0 away victory over VVV Venlo at their De Koel Stadion. This meant he had scored three goals in his first three games for PEC Zwolle.

Personal life
He is the son of former managing director of 1899 Hoffenheim Peter Görlich.

References

External links

Living people
2000 births
Sportspeople from Heidelberg
German footballers
3. Liga players
Regionalliga players
Eerste Divisie players
TSG 1899 Hoffenheim II players
Eintracht Braunschweig players
PEC Zwolle players
German expatriate footballers
German expatriate sportspeople in the Netherlands
Expatriate footballers in the Netherlands
21st-century German people